Raasi is a 1997 Indian Tamil-language drama film directed by Muraliappas and produced by S. S. Chakravarthy. The film stars Ajith Kumar and Rambha with Prakash Raj and Vadivelu playing supporting roles. The film was released on 18 April 1997. The film also marks the only collaboration of Ajith and Rambha.

Plot
This film is about the family of Kumar (Ajith Kumar) and his Uncle (Rambha's father) (Bala Singh). The problem between two families start when Kumar is unable to spend too much money for an occasion in his uncle's family. Whether Kumar and Meena (Rambha) get united after solving out all the problems forms the crux of the story.

Cast

Ajith Kumar as Kumar
Rambha as Meena
Prakash Raj as Melapatty Ramasamy's son
Nagesh as Freedom fighter
Vadivelu as Chidhambaram
Jayachitra as Rajalakshmi, Kumar's mother
Bala Singh as Kathirvel, Meena's father
Kavitha as Karpagam, Meena's mother
Neena as Kavitha, Kumar's sister
Sriman as Rathnavelu
Pawan as Kumar's friend
Kumarimuthu as Narikuravar
Kullamani as Narikuravar
Vaiyapuri as Narikuravar
Pasi Sathya as Narikuravar
Periya Karuppu Thevar as Periya Karuppu
Sangeetha Balan

Production
Shilpa Shetty was initially approached to play the leading female role but her unavailability led to the producers selecting Rambha.

Release
The film received mixed reviews upon release with a critic claiming there was "nothing original in the story or its handling" whilst mentioning that "people have mostly inexplicable changes of heart throughout the movie".

Soundtrack
Music was composed by Sirpy.

References

External links

1997 films
1990s Tamil-language films